Artūrs Rubiks (born 16 August 1970) is a Latvian politician, the son of Alfrēds Rubiks and the brother of Raimonds Rubiks. He is a member of  Harmony and a deputy of the 9th, 10th, 11th and 12th Saeima. He began his current term in parliament on November 4, 2014. He is also affiliated with the Socialist Party of Latvia.

References

External links
Saeima website

1970 births
Living people
Politicians from Riga
Socialist Party of Latvia politicians
Deputies of the 9th Saeima
Deputies of the 10th Saeima
Deputies of the 11th Saeima
Deputies of the 12th Saeima
Deputies of the 13th Saeima